

National team

Futsal European Clubs Championship

Top League
4th Russian futsal championship 1995/1996

Promotion tournament

National Cup

Final Four

Top League Cup

Final Four

First League

First stage

Group A

Group B

Group C

Group D

Group E

Group F

Second stage

Group G

Group Н

Final stage

Women's League
4th Russian women futsal championship 1995/1996

Women's National Cup

References

Russia
Seasons in Russian futsal
futsal
futsal